Jamník is a village and municipality in the Spišská Nová Ves District in the Košice Region of east central Slovakia.

History
In historical records the village was first mentioned in 1277.

Old and foreign name of village: 1277 Yempnik, 1287 Jemnuk, 1327 Jemnik, 1773 Jamník

German name: Jamnik

Hungary name: Szepesárki

Geography
In 2011 had a population of 1123 inhabitants. The village is located in the southern part of the Hornád basin in the valley of the Jamníček stream. The district town Spišská Nová Ves is 10 km away from the village and the county town Košice is approx. 60 km southeast of the village. The village's cadastre covers an area of approx. 814 ha (8,14 km2).

Genealogical resources

The records for genealogical research are available at the state archive "Statny Archiv in Levoca, Slovakia"

 Roman Catholic church records (births/marriages/deaths): 1687-1895 (parish B)

Sights
Church of St. Bartolomew, apostle was originally gothic from start of 14th century, in 15th century coped on a middle pillar. Tower with squared footprint was in 17th century renaissance rebuilt and terminated with attic. In 1940, vaulting broke down and damaged building was replaced by modern new building from 1951.

Old school is old building, where were learning children from Jamník to year 1992. Now is the building serving as a center of catholic youth.

Economy and infrastructure
Parish office 
 branch of Roman Catholic office Odorín
Education
 Kindergarten
 Primary school

See also
 List of municipalities and towns in Slovakia

References

External links
 
 
http://en.e-obce.sk/obec/jamnik-kosice/jamnik.html
https://web.archive.org/web/20071027094149/http://www.statistics.sk/mosmis/eng/run.html
Surnames of living people in Jamnik

Villages and municipalities in Spišská Nová Ves District